Gladyshev is a Russian masculine surname, its feminine counterpart is Gladysheva. It may refer to:

 Aleksei Gladyshev, Russian footballer
Anatoly Gladyshev (1947–1984), Russian ice speedway rider 
 Artur Gladyshev (singer) (born 1968), Russian singer
Svetlana Gladysheva (born 1971), Russian alpine skier
Vadim Gladyshev (born 1976), Russian football player

Russian-language surnames